Manuel Chaves González (born 7 July 1945 in Ceuta) is a Spanish politician who served as Third Deputy Prime Minister of Spain from 2009 to 2011 and Second Deputy Prime Minister of Spain in 2011. He is a member of the Spanish Socialist Workers' Party (PSOE) and was the Chairman of PSOE from 2000 to 2012. From 1990 to 2009 he was the President of the Regional Government of Andalusia.
He is a trustee of the Fundacion IDEAS, a socialist think tank. On 17 February 2015, together with former President of Andalusia, José Antonio Griñán, was implicated in the ERE case, a huge corruption scandal in the region.

National MP
Chaves entered national politics in 1977 when he was elected to the Spanish Congress of Deputies, representing Cádiz serving in Congress until 1990.

Minister of the Spanish Government (1986-1990)
Manuel served as the Minister of Work and National Health Service (Seguridad Social) of Spain between 1986 and 1990, under Prime Minister Felipe Gonzalez.

In 1988, he suffered a general strike (first in the current Spanish democracy) call by, among others, the UGT and CCOO due to a proposed law change.

President of the Autonomous Community of Andalusia (1990-2009)
In 1990, he became president of the Regional Government of Andalusia. At the time he was considered to be one of three barons of the PSOE, together with Juan Carlos Rodríguez Ibarra and José Bono, who were also autonomous presidents.

After the defeat of his party in the general election of 12 March 2000, after which Joaquín Almunia resigned as General Secretary of the party, Manuel took charge of the Political Commission. He organized the 35th Congress of the PSOE, which elected José Luis Rodríguez Zapatero as General Secretary.

Deputy Prime Minister of Spain (2009-2011)

In April 2009, Prime Minister Zapatero designated Chaves as Third Vice President of the Government and Minister of Territorial Policy (the former Ministry of Public Administrations). Chaves was promoted to Second Deputy Prime Minister of Spain in July 2011 after Elena Salgado became First Deputy Prime Minister. He left office in December 2011.

References 

1945 births
Living people
Presidents of the Regional Government of Andalusia
People from Ceuta
Government ministers of Spain
Members of the constituent Congress of Deputies (Spain)
Members of the 1st Congress of Deputies (Spain)
Members of the 2nd Congress of Deputies (Spain)
Members of the 3rd Congress of Deputies (Spain)
Members of the 4th Congress of Deputies (Spain)
Deputy Prime Ministers of Spain
Members of the 3rd Parliament of Andalusia
Members of the 4th Parliament of Andalusia
Members of the 5th Parliament of Andalusia
Members of the 6th Parliament of Andalusia
Members of the 7th Parliament of Andalusia
Members of the 8th Parliament of Andalusia